William Werkheiser (born February 19, 1960) is an American politician, and a 1982 Cum Laud graduate of Georgia Southern University where he earned a Bachelor of Science degree in Technology.  He was elected in 2014 to the Georgia House of Representatives for District 157, which consists of Tattnall, Evans and Wayne counties.  Werkheiser has served in the Georgia House of Representatives from the 157th district since 2015.

References

1960 births
Living people
Republican Party members of the Georgia House of Representatives
21st-century American politicians